North Church is located in Perth, Perth and Kinross, Scotland. Of Church of Scotland denomination, it is located on Mill Street, but its official address is 209 High Street (where its entrance is located behind the façades of the High Street properties). Completed in 1880, it is now a Category B listed building. The church's architect was Thomas Lennox Watson.

In 1985, the church joined with the now-defunct St Leonard's Parish Church, on Perth's King Street.

See also

List of listed buildings in Perth, Scotland

References

External links
 

Category B listed buildings in Perth and Kinross
Listed churches in Scotland
North Church
1880 establishments in Scotland
Listed buildings in Perth, Scotland
19th-century Church of Scotland church buildings
Church of Scotland churches